Lego Education (formerly known as Lego Dacta) is a Lego theme designed specifically for schools that concentrates sets that can be used by education institutions and includes sets the focus on Duplo and Technic themes and contain larger amounts of pieces. The theme was first introduced in 1999.

Overview
The product line focuses on the complete Lego learning pathway from elementary through high school.

Development
In 2017, Lego Education is the arm of The Lego Group dedicated to developing products for educators that fit with the school curriculum. Lego Education Senior Manager Simon Davenport explained, “We have been working with teachers and educational specialists for more than 37 years to help make learning fun." and continued, “We believe that expanding knowledge and building skills will create active, collaborative, lifelong learners. Together with educators we aim to enable every student to succeed in education and be prepared for future life challenges.”

In July 2017, Dublin City University’s Lego Education Innovation Studio teamed up with the Irish Girl Guides as part of an initiative to encourage teenage girls to become more involved with Science, Technology, Engineering and Maths.

On November 2017, Lego Education introduced a new learning product titled STEAM Park, to introduce preschool children to science technology, engineering, arts and maths (STEAM). STEAM Park, a new solution from Lego Education, encourages pre-school students to become interested in STEAM subjects by working in groups with Duplo bricks to build amusement park rides and attractions.

In 2018, Lego Education unveiled SPIKE Prime. SPIKE Prime is the newest hands-on STEAM (Science, Technology, Engineering, Arts, Math) product, unveiled by Lego Education. It brings together Lego bricks and a programmable Hub with sensors and motors. An app works with the hub to allow children to build programs, containing lessons that have been designed to fit within the classroom.

Lego Education President Esben Staerk encourages educators to equip students with key skills and confidence to face a job market that will be constantly shifting. Staerk explained, "Building knowledge is always going to be important …but developing complementary skills and knowledge will be crucial.”

Aaron Maurer, the STEM lead for the Mississippi Bend Area Education Agency in Iowa, explained why Lego Education products are useful in getting students to look at real-world problems and imagine how to solve them. Maurer stated, “Our goal is to equip students with the tools and mindset to be successful when it comes to doing hands-on learning and problem-solving connected to the education standards and to bring in real-world problems that help keeps students engaged. Students and teachers are trying to find ways to create engagement and Lego Education’s solutions allow this to happen because they are hands-on, allow for iteration without consequence, and help create a space where all ideas are welcome.”

In 2021, Lego Education Professional Development is a free online program that consists of two types of ‘self-guided learning modules’: Learning Bursts, which offer quick skills practice, and Learning Quests, which are geared towards deeper understanding and development of STEAM (science, technology, engineering, arts and maths) subjects. Jennifer Rodabaugh, a STEAM Lab Teacher at Picadome Elementary in Lexington, Kentucky explained, “As educators, we must build confidence in ourselves before we can build confidence in our students,” and continued, “Lego Education Professional Development offers any educator the opportunity to observe and learn from experienced teachers from anywhere.

Launch
Lego Education, the section of The Lego Group that works with schools and local communities was launched new coding resources in 2017. The new scheme from Lego Education offers free lesson plans, online courses for educators and encouragement for schools to get involved with the popular FIRST LEGO League. These are part of a selection of new tools that Lego Education are offering to schools.

In 2018, The Lego Group launched the Master Educators. In a new scheme from Lego Education, 110 Master Educators have been named as part of the first cohort. It is hoped that teachers from all over the world can share best practice and new ideas. Intending to expand the program, The Lego Group will accept applications from education professionals all over the world.

In 2019, Lego Education grows the Master Educator Program and had brings the total number of education professionals in the Master Educator Program to over 200 people, covering 39 US states.

In November 2018, The Lego Group announced at the China International Import Expo (CIIE) that was launched its first elementary school STEAM courses for Chinese students from next year, enabling local students to become active, collaborative learners and build 21st century skills.

In 2020, To celebrate 40 years of Lego Education, the company launched SPIKE Prime. First revealed in April last year, SPIKE Prime is the new product from Lego Education for schools. It uses the same system as BOOST, featuring a programmable Hub, sensors and motors that are used with the SPIKE app.

In August 2020, Lego Education had launched new free online resources, emphasising that they can be used anywhere, suggesting that they may help while remote learning is more commonplace.

In March 2021, Lego Education had launched comprehensive professional development for educators.

In June 2021, Lego Education was teaming up with NASA and the Artemis I team to bring a STEAM learning series to young students. It will be launched on 29 August 2022.

In November 2021, Lego Education announced two of its minifigures, Kate and Kyle, will launch into space for special STEAM learning series.

In June 2022, Lego Education had accepted new applications for Lego Education Ambassador Program (formerly known as Lego Education Master Educator Program). The applications will be open on 29 July 2022.

In March 2023, Lego Education launched Hannah’s STEAM Heroes: A Career Toolkit, a free classroom resource for teachers to inspire their students as they explore STEAM careers and discover their own jobs.

Construction sets
According to Bricklink, The Lego Group released a total of 1201 Lego sets as part of Lego Education theme.

BricQ
In 2021, The Lego Group announced the two sets was released in January 2021. The two sets were BricQ Motion Prime (set number: 45400) and BricQ Motion Essential (set number: 45401). Both sets dedicated to educating kids about STEAM (Science, Technology, Engineering, the Arts and Mathematics) in a physical manner.
 BricQ Motion Prime (set number: 45400) was released in January 2021. The set consists of 562 pieces with 4 minifigures. It was designed primarily for children with an age rating of six and above.
 BricQ Motion Essential (set number: 45401) was released in January 2021. The set consists of 523 pieces with 4 minifigures. It was designed primarily for children with an age rating of 10 and above.

Duplo
Duplo was a subtheme of Lego Education that consists of 51 sets that launched from 2005 until 2020. In 2020, The Lego Education revealed the five sets of Duplo, including Tubes, Letters, My XL World, Animals and People. The toy sets were marketed at children aged 2 and above.

FIRST LEGO League

In 2019, The Lego Group had unveiled a pair of Lego Education sets created exclusively for the FIRST LEGO League season.
 Boomtown Build (set number: 45810) was released in 2020. The set consists of 738 pieces.
 Challenge Set 2020 (set number: 45813) was released in 2020. The set consists of 1634 pieces with 2 minifigures.
 Cargo Connect Explore Set (set number: 45817) was released in 2021. The set consists of 884 pieces with 1 minifigure.

FIRST LEGO League Jr
FIRST LEGO League Jr was launched in 2018 and currently consists of five sets. The sets were designed primarily for children with an age rating of 4–6.
 Mission Moon (set number: 45807) was released in 2018. The set consists of 693 pieces.
 Explore Set (set number: 45814) was released in 2020. The set consists of 779 pieces.
 Discover Set (set number: 45815) was released in 2020. The set consists of 72 pieces with 3 minifigures.
 Cargo Connect Discover Set (set number: 45818) was released in 2020. 
 FIRST LEGO League Jr. Promotional Set (set number: 2000455) was released in 2019 as a promotion. The set consists of 18 pieces.

Mindstorms

The biggest change from the Lego Mindstorms NXT and NXT 2.0 to the EV3 is the technological advances in the programmable brick. The main processor of the NXT was an ARM7 microcontroller, whereas the EV3 has a more powerful ARM9 CPU running Linux. A USB connector and Micro SD slot (up to 32GB) are new to the EV3. It comes with the plans to build 5 different robots: EV3RSTORM, GRIPP3R, R3PTAR, SPIK3R, and TRACK3R. Lego has also released instructions online to build 12 additional projects: ROBODOZ3R, BANNER PRINT3R, EV3MEG, BOBB3E, MR-B3AM, RAC3 TRUCK, KRAZ3, EV3D4, EL3CTRIC GUITAR, DINOR3X, WACK3M, and EV3GAME. It uses a program called Lego Mindstorms EV3 Home Edition, which is powered by LabVIEW, to write code using blocks instead of lines. However it can also be programmed on the actual robot and saved. MicroPython support has been recently added.
The Education EV3 Core Set (set number: 45544) set consists of: 1 EV3 programmable brick, 2 Large Motors, 1 Medium Motor, 2 Touch Sensors, 1 Color Sensor, 1 Gyroscopic Sensor, 1 Ultrasonic Sensor, cables, USB cable, 1 Rechargeable battery and 541 pieces of TECHNIC elements.

An expansion set for the Educational EV3 Core Set (set number: 45560), which can be bought separately, contains 853 Lego elements. However, the expansion set and the educational set combined do not contain enough components necessary to build most robots of the retail set. This contrasts with NXT; the educational set combined with the resource set could build any of the retail designs. The EV3 educational set was released a month earlier than the retail set, on August 1, 2013. Robots that can be built with the core education set are the EV3 educator robot, the GyroBoy, the Colour Sorter, the Puppy and the Robot Arm H25. Robots that can be built with the expansion set are the Tank Bot, the Znap, the Stair Climber, the Elephant and a remote control. Another robot that can be built with a pair of core sets and an expansion set is the Spinner Factory.

Spike Prime
Spike Prime was announced in April 2019. While not being part of the Mindstorms product line, the basic set includes three motors (1 large 2 medium) and sensors for distance, force and color, also it has an internal sensor, a gyroscope. a controller brick based on an STM32F413 microcontroller and 520+ Lego Technic elements.

SPIKE Essential Set (set number: 45345) was released on 6 October 2021. The set consists of 449 pieces with 4 minifigures. The set included an intelligent Hub, motors, a Light Matrix and a Colour Sensor. The SPIKE App included age-appropriate icon and word-based coding based on Scratch, helps develop student coding skills.

System
In 2016, Community Minifigure Set (set number: 45022) was released on 1 January 2016. The set consists of 256 pieces with 21 minifigures.

WeDo
In 2009, The Lego Education launched WeDo 1.0 system in 2009 with two sets. The two sets were WeDo Construction Set (set number: 9580) and WeDo Resource Set (set number: 9585). The sets were designed primarily for children with an age rating of 7–11.

In 2016, Lego Education at CES 2016 announced the WeDo 2.0 was launched in 2016 robotics kit for elementary school students. The updated WeDo 2.0 was designed to teach kids from second to fourth grades STEM basics. The WeDo 2.0 core set (set number: 45300) included a programmable Smarthub, medium motor, two sensors and 280 pieces. Also the software included the Get Start Project which is an introductory experience to the WeDo 2.0 resource. The software is compatible with PC, Macs, Android and iOS smartphones and tablets.

See also 
 Duplo
 Technic
 Lego Mindstorms
 Lego City
 Lego Minifigures (theme)

References

External links 
 Official website

Lego
Lego themes
Products introduced in 1999